Robert Allenby (born 12 July 1971) is an Australian professional golfer.

Early years
Allenby was born on 12 July 1971 in Melbourne, Victoria. His father had emigrated to Australia from Leeds, UK as a young man.

Professional career
He turned professional in 1992 and was successful almost immediately, topping the PGA Tour of Australasia Order of Merit in his first season and again in 1994. He continues to play some events on his home tour and has won 13 times in Australassia, including the Victorian Open as an amateur. He also began to play on the European Tour and it was his principal tour until 1998. He won four tournaments on it, including three in 1996, when he finished third on the Order of Merit. He has featured in the top 20 of the Official World Golf Rankings.

Allenby now plays primarily in the U.S. on the PGA Tour. He earned exempt status for 1999 by finishing 17th at the 1998 Qualifying School. He had a disappointing first season in America, coming 126th on the money list, but came good in 2000 when he won the Shell Houston Open and the Advil Western Open. He claimed another pair of wins the following season. In both of those years he came 16th on the money list. He has not won since but finished in the top 50 each year from 2002 to 2004. His performances in the major championships have been somewhat disappointing; his highest placing in a major is tied seventh at the 2004 U.S. Open. In 2005 he became the first golfer to win the "triple crown" of the Australian Masters, Australian PGA and Australian Open in the same year.

Allenby played for the International Team in the Presidents Cup in 1994, 1996, 2000, 2003 and 2009. After posting a 2–2–1 record in the 2009 Presidents Cup, Allenby accused Anthony Kim of being ill-prepared for his Sunday singles match, in which Allenby lost 5 and 3. In December 2009 Allenby became the first Australian to win the Nedbank Golf Challenge in South Africa, defeating Henrik Stenson in a playoff. It was his first professional win in four years, but he did not have to wait long for the next as he returned home to claim his fourth Australian PGA Championship title the following week.

Allenby missed the cut in the 2011 Masters Tournament by one stroke after bogeying the 18th hole of the second round. In February 2012, Allenby missed an opportunity to end an eleven-year drought on the PGA Tour, when he took a two stroke advantage to the 72nd hole of the Mayakoba Golf Classic. He hit his tee shot into the trees on the right and proceeded to make double bogey to fall into a playoff with rookie John Huh. He lost out at the eighth extra hole when he could only bogey the par three 10th, leaving Huh with a tap in par for the tournament. Both players had made par on all seven previous holes throughout the playoff until this point.

Allenby is a patron and spokesperson for Challenge Cancer Support Network, which has raised more than $9 million since 1993 for children with cancer and blood disorders. He resides in Jupiter, Florida. On 22 June 2000, Allenby was awarded the Australian Sports Medal.

Controversy
Statements Allenby made at the 2009 and 2011 Presidents Cups generated controversy. In 2009, following a loss to American Anthony Kim in the Sunday singles, Allenby accused Kim of partying all night on the eve of the Singles matches. That statement was vehemently denied by Kim and the members of the American team. In 2011, following a 0–4–0 record at the Presidents Cup where he failed to gain any points for the International team, he asserted that his record wasn't completely his fault and cited his partners' poor play as a reason. His partners, including Geoff Ogilvy, were displeased with Allenby's comments.

The following week, at the Australian PGA Championship, Allenby got into contention which resulted in Ogilvy making a tweet that Allenby perceived as being sarcastic. After the tournament ended, Allenby exchanged heated words with Ogilvy and came close to having a physical altercation with Ogilvy.

In July 2015 at the RBC Canadian Open, Allenby had a verbal altercation with his caddie, Mick Middlemo, after playing four holes. While Allenby says that he was verbally abused and threatened by Middlemo, Middlemo says Allenby was verbally abusive. Middlemo walked off the course and Allenby selected a school principal from the gallery to carry his clubs the rest of the round. Later reports from another caddy in the group, Simon Clarke, seemed to indicate the problem was with Allenby. "I've known Rob for a long time and I've known Mick for a long time," Clarke said. "It's disappointing that at age 42, or however old he [Allenby] is, he's still treating people that way and how many good caddies he's gone through.

Alleged kidnapping
On 17 January 2015, after missing the cut at the Sony Open in Hawaii, Allenby was at a bar in Honolulu, Hawaii, when he says he was kidnapped, robbed and beaten, before being dumped in a park several miles away. An arrest was made concerning the false use of Allenby's credit card for adult entertainment purposes. The case was "mistaken identity".

Amateur wins
1989 (1) Australian Juniors Amateur Championship
1990 (2) Victorian Amateur Championship, Riversdale Cup
1991 (1) Riversdale Cup

Professional wins (22)

PGA Tour wins (4)

PGA Tour playoff record (3–2)

European Tour wins (4)

European Tour playoff record (3–0)

Sunshine Tour wins (1)

Sunshine Tour playoff record (1–0)

PGA Tour of Australasia wins (12)

1Co-sanctioned by the OneAsia Tour

PGA Tour of Australasia playoff record (3–1)

Other wins (1)

Results in major championships

CUT = missed the half-way cut
"T" = tied

Summary

Most consecutive cuts made – 7 (2000 Open Championship – 2002 U.S. Open)
Longest streak of top-10s – 1 (five times)

Results in The Players Championship

CUT = missed the halfway cut
"T" indicates a tie for a place

Results in World Golf Championships

1Cancelled due to 9/11

QF, R16, R32, R64 = Round in which player lost in match play
"T" = tied
NT = No Tournament
Note that the HSBC Champions did not become a WGC event until 2009.

Results in senior major championships

CUT = missed the halfway cut
"T" indicates a tie for a place

Team appearances
Amateur
Eisenhower Trophy (representing Australia): 1990
Nomura Cup (representing Australia): 1991 (winners)
Sloan Morpeth Trophy (representing Australia): 1990 (winners), 1991 (winners)
Australian Men's Interstate Teams Matches (representing Victoria): 1989, 1990, 1991

Professional
World Cup (representing Australia): 1993, 1995, 2009
Dunhill Cup (representing Australia): 1994, 1997
Presidents Cup (International Team): 1994, 1996, 2000, 2003 (tie), 2009, 2011
Alfred Dunhill Challenge (representing Australasia): 1995

See also
1998 PGA Tour Qualifying School graduates

References

External links

 Robert Allenby player profile, Golf Australia

Australian male golfers
PGA Tour of Australasia golfers
European Tour golfers
PGA Tour golfers
PGA Tour Champions golfers
Recipients of the Australian Sports Medal
Golfers from Melbourne
Sportsmen from Victoria (Australia)
Australian people of English descent
1971 births
Living people